Frank Bartkus (November 11, 1915 – September 2, 1986) was a U.S. soccer goalkeeper who was a member of the U.S. soccer team at the 1936 Summer Olympics.

Bartkus was selected as a member of the U.S. soccer team at the 1936 Olympic Games.  He played in the only U.S. game of the tournament, a 1-0 loss to Italy.  At the time, he played for the Brooklyn German Sports Club of the German American Soccer League.  German S.C. won the 1936 National Amateur Cup.

References

1915 births
1986 deaths
American soccer players
Association football goalkeepers
Olympic soccer players of the United States
Footballers at the 1936 Summer Olympics
German-American Soccer League players
People from Merrick, New York
Soccer players from New York (state)